Samarskite is a radioactive rare earth mineral series which includes samarskite-(Y), with the chemical formula  and samarskite-(Yb), with the chemical formula .

Samarskite crystallizes in the orthorhombic - dipyramidal class as black to yellowish brown stubby prisms although it is typically found as anhedral masses. Specimens with a high uranium content are typically metamict and appear coated with a yellow brown earthy rind. 

Samarskite occurs in rare earth bearing granite pegmatites with other rare minerals. It occurs in association with columbite, zircon, monazite, uraninite, aeschynite, magnetite, albite, topaz, beryl, garnet, muscovite and biotite.

Samarskite was first described in 1847 for an occurrence in Miass, Ilmen Mountains, Southern Ural Mountains of Russia. The chemical element samarium was first isolated from a specimen of samarskite in 1879. Samarium was named after samarskite which was named for the Russian mine official, Colonel Vasili Samarsky-Bykhovets (1803–1870).

Samarskite-(Yb) was first described in 2004 for an occurrence in the South Platte Pegmatite District, Jefferson County, Colorado.

See also
 Decipium, a mis-identified new element, thought to have been extracted from samarskite in 1878 by Marc Delafontaine.
List of minerals
List of minerals named after people

References

Uranium(III) minerals
Yttrium minerals
Lanthanide minerals
Iron(II,III) minerals
Niobium minerals
Tantalum minerals
Oxide minerals
Orthorhombic minerals
Minerals in space group 60
Thorium minerals